Henry Davie may refer to:

 Henry Ferguson Davie (1797–1885), British politician and army officer
 Henry Davie (New York politician) (1833–1908), American lawyer and politician from New York
 Harry Davie (1905–1968), Australian rules footballer

See also
 Henry Davy (1793–1865), English landscape painter, engraver and lithographer